Kampen Church is a parish church of the Church of Norway in Stavanger Municipality in Rogaland county, Norway. It is located in the Kampen in the borough of Eiganes og Våland in the city of Stavanger. It is the church for the Kampen parish which is part of the Stavanger domprosti (arch-deanery) in the Diocese of Stavanger. The large, concrete church was built in a rectangular design in 1957 using designs by the architect T. Bryne. The church seats about 280 people.

See also
List of churches in Rogaland

References

Churches in Stavanger
20th-century Church of Norway church buildings
Churches completed in 1957
1957 establishments in Norway